Marion Jones won the singles tennis title of the 1899 U.S. Women's National Singles Championship by defeating Maud Banks 6–1, 6–1, 7–5 in the final of the All Comers' competition. The reigning champion Juliette Atkinson did not defend her title and therefore no challenge round was held. The event was played on outdoor grass courts and held at the Philadelphia Cricket Club in Wissahickon Heights, Chestnut Hill, Philadelphia from June 21 through June 24, 1899.

Draw

All Comers' finals

References

1899
1899 in American women's sports
June 1899 sports events
Women's Singles
1899 in women's tennis
Women's sports in Pennsylvania
Chestnut Hill, Philadelphia
1899 in sports in Pennsylvania